Robin Campbell Jeffrey  (19 February 1939 – 4 November 2018) was a Scottish engineer and businessman, who became executive chairman of British Energy.

Early life
He was the son of Robert Jeffrey and Catherine Campbell McSporran. He attended Lenzie Academy and Kelvinside Academy, and studied for a BSc in Mechanical Engineering at the Royal College of Science and Technology (University of Strathclyde), where he was later a visiting professor, and a PhD at Pembroke College, Cambridge.

Career

Babcock & Wilcox
1966–1979 Babcock and Wilcox Research Station, Renfrew.

South of Scotland Electricity Board
From 1980–88 he was the project manager for the design and construction of Torness Nuclear Power Station, which was delivered on time and to budget.

Scottish Nuclear
He was chief executive of Scottish Nuclear from 1992–1995.

British Energy
British Energy was formed in 1996 and he was deputy chairman from 1996–2001. He was chairman and chief executive of British Energy from June 2001 to November 2002.

Personal life
He married in 1962 and has two sons and a daughter. He died on 4 November 2018 at the age of 79.

References

1939 births
2018 deaths
Academics of the University of Strathclyde
Alumni of Pembroke College, Cambridge
Alumni of the University of Strathclyde
British chief executives in the energy industry
Businesspeople from Glasgow
Businesspeople in nuclear power
Fellows of the Institution of Mechanical Engineers
Fellows of the Royal Academy of Engineering
Nuclear power in the United Kingdom
Nuclear power in Scotland
People educated at Kelvinside Academy
People educated at Lenzie Academy
Scottish chief executives
20th-century Scottish businesspeople